The Tassaert family was a family, originating in Antwerp, which produced a number of painters, sculptors, illustrators and art dealers, some of whom later settled or worked in France and Prussia in the 17th and 18th centuries.  Its members include:
 Pieter Tassaert the Elder (?- Antwerp c. 1692), painter and art dealer, received as a master into the Antwerp Guild of Saint Luke in 1635.
 Lucas Tassaert (1635–?), painter in Antwerp, son of Pieter the Elder.
 Maria Tassaert (1642 – after 1665), still life painter active in Antwerp, daughter of Pieter the Elder.
 Peter Frans Tassaert (1644–1725), painter, gilder and art dealer in Antwerp, son of Pieter the Elder.
 Jan Pieter Tassaert (1651–1725), painter, gilder and art dealer in Antwerp, son of Pieter the Elder.
 Jean-Pierre-Antoine Tassaert (1729–1788), sculptor, Jan Pieter's grandson, born in Antwerp, worked in Antwerp, then London (1744) and Paris and finally Berlin (1775).
 Jean-Joseph-François Tassaert (1765-1838), engraver and painter, son of Jean-Pierre-Antoine, definitely established in Paris (1792).
 Paul Tassaert (1792-1850), French engraver, son of Jean-Joseph-François.
 Octave Tassaert (1810-1874), French painter, son of Jean-Joseph-François.
 Henriette-Félicité Tassaert, (1766-1818), miniaturist, daughter of Jean-Pierre-Antoine, active in Prussia.
 Antoinette Tassaert (1768-1823), miniaturist, member of the Berlin Academy, daughter of Jean-Pierre-Antoine active in Prussia.  Married chamber musician Johann Joseph Beer after which she signed her works 'Antoinette Beer'.
 Philip Joseph Tassaert (Antwerp 1732 - London 1803), painter and mezzotint-engraver, brother of Jean-Pierre-Antoine.

References

Artist families
Flemish painters (before 1830)
Flemish engravers